Acquarica del Capo was a town and comune in the  province of Lecce, Apulia, south-eastern Italy. In 2019 it was merged with the adjacent Presicce to form Presicce-Acquarica. 

It is located in Salento, 10 km from the Ionian Sea and 60 km from Lecce. Its origins are medieval and it grew around a Norman fortification. Later it was transformed into a castle town by the Aragonese.

Main sights
Medieval castle. It was probably a Norman fortification around which the village developed in the Middle Ages and was later transformed in a Castle in the 14th century by Giovanni Antonio Orsini Del Balzo, Prince of Taranto. Only a round tower remains from the original four. In the court can be seen the so-called "Pila di Pompignano" saved from destruction in 1982 by the local writer Carlo Stasi who wrote its legend.
Church of San Carlo Borromeo
Church of San Giovanni Battista
Church Madonna dei Panetti, at Celsorizzo, one of the most ancient constructions in the lower Salento.
Fortified masseria of Celsorizzo. A huge Norman Tower with Byzantine frescoes in the Chapel at its base.
Church of Madonna di Pompignano

References

Cities and towns in Apulia
Localities of Salento